A Swag of Aussie Poetry, originally Out of the Bluegums (150 Years of Australian Verse), is a mid-1980s recording project with celebrity voices reciting or singing Australian poetry. The compilation consists of 53 works of prose and verse from writers across Australia's literary landscape, and features 31 narrators delivering a mix of folk ballads and bush poetry from the 1800s through to 20th century prose, and lyrical songs reflecting on life in their country. It was released originally as a double album and a double cassette on J&B Records in 1984 with 50 tracks. The compilation was produced by Gene Pierson – born as Giancarlo Salvestrin,

In 2010 the material was digitally re-mastered as a 2-CD set on the Lifestyle Music label which was released on 2 August 2010. Pierson lamented the death of many contributing artists since the original album, "the fact this compilation has been re-mastered 25 years after they made their contributions means this is not only a memorial to our great poets but to those people who bought their words alive again for listeners in the 21st century". The cover art was by Australian outback painter, Pro Hart. In Australia it appeared in September the following year. The CD cover art is by Jenny Glaze and is based on The Swagman, circa 1908.

Poets and writers
Nancy (Nan) May McDonald, Douglas Stewart, Kate Llewellyn, A.D. Hope, Ronald McCuaig, R.F. Brissenden, Spike Milligan, P.J. Hartigan (John O’Brien), Dame Mary Gilmore, Jack Moses, Judith Wright, Les Murray, Henry Kendall, Mary Durack-Miller, Norman Lindsay, Vivian Smith, David Campbell, Henry Lawson, James McAuley, Rhyll McMaster, A.B. (Banjo) Paterson, R.D. Fitzgerald, Peter Lawson, Kenneth Slessor, John Blight, Dorothea Mackellar, Victor Daley, Ray Mathew, Kath Walker, Kenneth Mackenzie, Alwyn Lee, Alisha Salvestrin, Ron Jones, Peter Allen, Charles Perkins and Dame Edna Everage.

Narrators
Barry Humphries, Spike Milligan, Dame Joan Sutherland, Bobby Limb, Ron Jones, John Meillon, Bert Newton, Dame Edna Everage, Rolf Harris, Sir Robert Helpmann, Ita Buttrose, Peter Allen, Thomas Keneally, John Newcombe, Judy Stone, Smoky Dawson, Terry Willesee, John Waters, Dawn Lake, Judy Morris, Diane Cilento, Simon Townsend, Eddie Charlton, Charles Perkins, Dawn Fraser, Rowena Wallace, Michael Edgley, Peter Lawson, Ron Haddrick, Rev. Roger Bush and Alisha Salvestrin.

Track listing

References

External links
 Guide to Australian poetry
 Early Australian bush poems
 Jack Moses
 Keith Newman

Australian poetry collections
1984 albums